William McCaghwell, brother of Eugene McCaghwell, Bishop of Clogher, was a priest in Ireland in the early 16th century. He was Dean of Clogher until his death in 1508.

References

16th-century Irish Roman Catholic priests
Deans of Clogher
1508 deaths